Roman Potočný (born 25 April 1991) is a Czech professional footballer who plays as a forward for Dynamo České Budějovice in the Czech First League.

He made his league debut for Bohemians on 21 May 2011 in the 1–1 Fortuna Liga home draw against Teplice, a team he would join four years later. He scored his first goals in a professional league competition on 28 February 2015 in the 2-2 Czech First League draw against Slavia Prague.

Career statistics

International

References

External links
 
 

1991 births
Living people
People from Roudnice nad Labem
Czech footballers
Czech Republic international footballers
Czech First League players
SFC Opava players
FK Teplice players
Bohemians 1905 players
FC Slovan Liberec players
Association football forwards
FC Baník Ostrava players
FC Silon Táborsko players
FC Viktoria Plzeň players
Czech National Football League players
Sportspeople from the Ústí nad Labem Region
SK Dynamo České Budějovice players